Chahar Chubeh (also Romanized as Chahār Chūbeh and Chahār Jubeh) is a village in Golestan Rural District, in the Central District of Jajrom County, North Khorasan Province, Iran. At the 2006 census, its population was 313, in 76 families.

References 

Populated places in Jajrom County